’’Bëlï, or Jur Beli, is a Central Sudanic language spoken by the Beli and Sopi people of South Sudan. The Beli people are mainly found in South Sudan, a region southeast of Rumbek. The language is considered as endangered, and it is mostly spoken by the older generation.

However, it has three dialects and variations that are specific to different regions and communities. The language has a complex grammatical structure, with a rich system of prefixes that are used to indicate various grammatical features, such as, mood, and aspect.

Despite the lack of written material and limited use, Jur Beli is an important language for the Beli people, as it is an essential part of their cultural identity. The language serves as an important means of communication within the community, and it is used to transmit cultural knowledge and traditions from one generation to the next.

Brief description about the Jur Beli people 
The Jur (Beli & Modo) people, a group of over “100,000” (according to a source found online) individuals divided into two distinct geographic groups: Beli and Modo. The Beli live in the area extending from Bahr Gel to Wulu and Billing, while the Modo live in Mvolo, Bogri, Woko, and Bahr Girindi near Yirol. The area is characterized by flat plains with granitoid rocks and has a rich savannah in the east and tropical equatoria in the west, which allows for extensive agricultural activities. The Jur (Beli & Modo) are sedentary agriculturalists who practice shifting cultivation and raise crops such as sorghum, millet, beans, cassava, groundnuts, and simsim (Sesame).They also engage in hunting, fishing, and beekeeping. The main economic potential of the area is timber, honey, and shea oil. The Jur (Beli & Modo) believe they came from the Central African Republic and have a language that belongs to the central Sudanic group of languages but is linguistically similar to the Baka/Bongo group. Their society is organized into kinships, clans, and families and has elaborate customs and traditions. Marriage customs include respect for in-laws and paying a dowry, which is marked by the groom working in the in-laws' gardens and building a house for them.

Geographic distribution 
Jur Beli is a nilo-saharan language of western, central Sudan in the bongo-baka group. In South Sudan, a region southeast of Rumbek is home to 65,000 Jur Beli speakers (Lewis et al. 2013).

Classification and dialects 
According to Persson, there are three dialects of the Jur Beli  language: Wulu, Bahri Girinti, and Sopi (Persson 1997:31–32).

In the diagram shown below is the language group of Jur Beli

Numbers 
Number is an essential part of the Jur Beli language. Listed below are the numbers from 1 to 10.)

Consonants 
In the Jur Beli language, 28 distinct consonant phonemes have been identified, which include voiceless and voiced stops, nasals, Prenasalised stops, Fricative implosives, and approximants. These phonemes can be found in various positions within words and play an important role in the syllable structure of the language. (Reference: Post, D. G. (2014). A Grammar of Jur Beli: A Western Nilotic Language of South Sudan. SIL International.)

In the Jur Beli language, it is typical for consonant phonemes to occur at the beginning of syllables, while vowel phonemes occur at the end. This means that words in Jur Beli language are typically made up of a sequence of syllables, each beginning with a consonant and ending with a vowel.

It's worth noting that this is a general pattern in the Jur Beli language, but there may be exceptions to this rule.

Morphology 
Morphology in the context of the Jur Beli language refers to the study of how words are formed and structured in the language.

Tone 
Tone refers to the pitch of the voice used to produce a sound, and it is used to convey meaning. In languages like Jur Beli, tone is used to distinguish between words that would otherwise be identical in terms of their sound.

H demonstrate high tone, M demonstrate medium tone, and L demonstrate low tone.

Conjuctions (connectors) 
A conjunction is a word that joins two or more sentences, clauses, or words. It can be used to link similar words together, such as when "and" is used to link two nouns, or it can be used to link clauses or phrases.

Dependent clause conjunctions before main clauses:  Subordinating conjunctions are nouns that link a dependent sentence to an independent clause, usually referred to as the main clause. The context of the dependent clause is provided by the main clause because it is not a complete sentence on its own. Example:

This “nate” sentence, which repeats information, slows down the narrative to demonstrate the relevance of what follows next. 

Main clause conjunctions: The words that join main clauses or independent clauses together are known as main clause conjunctions. They serve as a joining device and signal that the clauses are of equal weight. For instance:

A dependent clause is introduced by the connector kidi “if” before the action of the subsequent main clause. Kidi begins a clause with fresh information rather than reiterating previously stated material. A condition or the first of two acts in a two-step sequence can constitute the new information.   

Dependent clause conjunctions after main clauses: The word that tells a reason behind previous clause. For example:

The connector "bonɔ" is used to introduce a clause that explains the reason or purpose for the main clause that precedes it. It serves to indicate the motivation behind the action described in the previous clause. The clause introduced by "bonɔ" typically comes after the main clause and explains the why of the main clause action. 

Relative clause connectors inside main clauses: Relative clauses are clauses that modify a noun or pronoun and are introduced by a relative pronoun. They provide additional information about the noun or pronoun and are usually set off by commas. They can be used within a main clause to give more information about the noun or pronoun that the main clause is talking about. 

The connector "na" is used to introduce a clause that helps to specify or clarify a noun or pronoun that came before the clause. It limits the possible options of the noun or pronoun, making it more specific. It is often used to give more details about the noun or pronoun in the previous clause.

Phonology

Consonants 
Stirtz (2014) lists the following consonant phonemes:

Vowels 
According to Stirtz (2014), ’Bëlï has nine vowel phonemes that can be divided into [+/- ATR] sets. The vowel [ə] is an allophone that does not occur in roots without other [+ATR] vowels:

References

 

Definitely endangered languages
Languages of South Sudan
Bongo–Bagirmi languages